The Lero-Lero Family (Portuguese: A Família Lero-Lero) is a 1953 Brazilian comedy film directed by Alberto Pieralisi and starring Walter D'Ávila, Marina Freire and Luiz Linhares.

Partial cast
 Walter D'Ávila as Aquiles Taveira  
 Marina Freire as Isolina  
 Luiz Linhares as Teteco  
 Ricardo Bandeira as Janjão  
 Helena Barreto Leite as Laurita  
 Elísio de Albuquerque as Laranjeira 
 Renato Consorte

References

Bibliography
 Shaw, Lisa & Dennison, Stephanie. Brazilian National Cinema. Routledge, 2014.

External links

1953 comedy films
1953 films
Brazilian comedy films
1950s Portuguese-language films
Brazilian black-and-white films